Antron Dwayne Dillon (born June 7, 1985) is an American football defensive lineman who is currently a free agent. He played college football at the University of North Alabama and attended Independence High School in Independence, Louisiana. He has also been a member of the Arizona Rattlers, Portland Thunder, Los Angeles KISS, Jacksonville Sharks and Tampa Bay Storm.

Early life
Dillon attended Independence High School.

College career
In January 2003, Dillon committed to play football for the Vanderbilt Commodores. Dillon transferred to Southwest Mississippi Community College for two seasons, before transferring to North Alabama. Dillon played with the Lions in 2007, then after a two-year gap, played again for the Lions in 2010.

Professional career

Arizona Rattlers
In October 2012, Dillon was assigned to the Arizona Rattlers on a two-year deal. Dillon helped the Rattlers to two ArenaBowl championships in 2013 and 2014.

Portland Thunder
Dillon was assigned to the Portland Thunder during the 2013 Expansion Draft.

Los Angeles KISS
In February 2015, Dillon was assigned to the Los Angeles KISS.

Jacksonville Sharks
In March 2016, Dillon was assigned to the Jacksonville Sharks.

Tampa Bay Storm
On January 12, 2017, Dillon was assigned to the Tampa Bay Storm. The Storm folded in December 2017.

Florida Tarpons
Dillon signed with the Florida Tarpons of the American Arena League on January 22, 2018.

Atlantic City Blackjacks
On March 18, 2019, Dillon was assigned to the Atlantic City Blackjacks.

References

External links
 Vanderbilt Commodores bio

Living people
1985 births
Players of American football from Louisiana
Sportspeople from Hammond, Louisiana
American football defensive linemen
Vanderbilt Commodores football players
Southwest Mississippi Bears football players
North Alabama Lions football players
Arizona Rattlers players
Portland Thunder players
Los Angeles Kiss players
Jacksonville Sharks players
Tampa Bay Storm players
Florida Tarpons players
Atlantic City Blackjacks players